William David Daniels (born March 31, 1927) is an American actor, who is best known for his television roles, notably as Mark Craig in the drama series St. Elsewhere, for which he won two Primetime Emmy Awards; the voice of KITT in the television series Knight Rider; and as George Feeny in the sitcom Boy Meets World, which earned him four People's Choice Award nominations. He reprised his Knight Rider role in the sequel TV movie Knight Rider 2000 and his Boy Meets World role in the sequel series Girl Meets World. He also portrayed Carter Nash (actual identity of the eponymous comedic superhero) in Captain Nice.

Daniels' film roles include Mr. Braddock (Benjamin Braddock's father) in The Graduate, Howard Maxwell-Manchester in Two for the Road, and John Adams in the musical film 1776. He was president of the Screen Actors Guild from 1999 to 2001 and led the union's efforts during the 2000 commercial actors strike.

Daniels is also noted for having portrayed in film or on television the three most prominent members of the Adams political family: John Adams, his cousin and fellow founding father, Samuel Adams, and John Adams’ son John Quincy Adams.

Early life
William David Daniels was born on March 31, 1927, in Brooklyn, New York City, New York, to Irene and David Daniels. His father was a bricklayer, and his mother was a telephone operator. He has two sisters, Jacqueline and Carol. He grew up in East New York, Brooklyn.

Daniels was drafted into the U.S. Army in 1945 and stationed in Italy, where he served as a disc jockey at an Army radio station. At the suggestion of Howard Lindsay, co-author of Life with Father, who recommended he use the GI Bill to attend a college with a good drama department, Daniels enrolled at Northwestern University. He graduated from Northwestern in 1949, and is a member of Sigma Nu fraternity.

Career

Daniels began his career as a member of the singing Daniels family in Brooklyn. He made his television debut as part of a variety act (along with other members of his family) in 1943, on NBC, then a single station in New York. He made his Broadway debut in 1943 in Life with Father, and remained a busy Broadway actor for decades afterwards. His Broadway credits include roles in 1776, A Thousand Clowns, On a Clear Day You Can See Forever, and A Little Night Music. He received an Obie Award for The Zoo Story (1960).

Daniels's motion picture debut was as a school principal in the 1963 anti-war drama film Ladybug Ladybug. In 1965, he reprised his Broadway role as a child welfare worker in the screen version of A Thousand Clowns. In 1967 he appeared in The Graduate as the father of Dustin Hoffman's character. In 1969, Daniels starred as John Adams in the Broadway musical 1776; he also appeared in the film version in 1972. Two years later, he co-starred in Richard Donner's telefilm Sarah T. - Portrait of a Teenage Alcoholic. in 1979 he again reprised his role as the outspoken John Adams in the film Rebels, again about the American revolution, without seeming to ever break character. He is known as the quintessential John Adams.

Daniels's first network television appearance came in 1952 when he portrayed the young John Quincy Adams, eldest son of John and Abigail Adams in the Hallmark Hall of Fame drama A Woman for the Ages. In 1976, he reprised the role as the middle-aged and elder John Quincy Adams in the acclaimed PBS miniseries The Adams Chronicles. He starred in the short-lived series Captain Nice as police chemist Carter Nash. He appeared as acid-tongued Dr. Mark Craig in St. Elsewhere from 1982 to 1988, for which he won two Emmy awards. Concurrently, he provided the voice of KITT in Knight Rider from 1982 to 1986. Daniels said in 1982, "My duties on Knight Rider are very simple. I do it in about an hour and a half. I've never met the cast. I haven't even met the producer."

He reprised the voice-only role of KITT in 1991 for the television movie Knight Rider 2000, and again in the theatrical comedy movie The Benchwarmers. He performed the role in AT&T and GE commercials about talking machines, and twice in The Simpsons as well as at the Comedy Central Roast of his co-star David Hasselhoff. He reprised the role of KITT in the 2015 Lego-themed action-adventure video game Lego Dimensions.

Daniels portrayed strict but loving educator George Feeny at John Adams High School in Boy Meets World from 1993 to 2000. In addition to the previously mentioned 1967 superhero sitcom Captain Nice, he was a regular on the 1970s TV series Freebie and the Bean and The Nancy Walker Show.

A familiar character actor, he has appeared as a guest star on numerous TV comedies and dramas, including Soap, The Rockford Files, Quincy, M.E., Kolchak: The Night Stalker, and many others. In 2012, Daniels appeared in the ninth season of Grey's Anatomy as Dr. Craig Thomas, an unlikely mentor to the character of Dr. Cristina Yang played by actress Sandra Oh. His character, Dr. Thomas, died in the operating room while performing a procedure to repair a heart defect midway through the season, which forced Yang to move back to Seattle.

In 2014, Daniels reprised his role as Mr. Feeny in the pilot episode of the Boy Meets World spinoff, Girl Meets World. He cameoed in the final scene, praising the adult Cory Matthews for his parenting. He made additional appearances in the second and third seasons.

Personal life

Daniels has been married to actress and fellow Emmy Award winner Bonnie Bartlett since June 30, 1951; at more than 71 years, it is the longest active Hollywood marriage as of October 2022. In 1961, Bartlett gave birth to a son, who died 24 hours later. They adopted two sons: Michael, who became an assistant director and stage manager in Los Angeles, and Robert, who became an artist and computer graphics designer based in New York City.

Bartlett and Daniels both served on the Screen Actors Guild's board of directors.

Awards and honors
Daniels refused the 1969 Tony Award nomination for Featured Actor in a Musical in 1776 due to his insistence that the part of John Adams was a leading role rather than supporting. He was ruled to be ineligible for the Best Actor nomination because of the technicality that his name was not billed above the title of the show.

In 1986, Daniels and Bartlett, who played his fictional wife on St. Elsewhere and Boy Meets World, won Emmy Awards on the same night, becoming the first married couple to accomplish the feat since Alfred Lunt and Lynn Fontanne in 1965 for a production of The Magnificent Yankee for the Hallmark Hall of Fame.

Filmography

Film

Television

Video games

Books
 Daniels, William (2017). There I Go Again: How I Came to Be Mr. Feeny, John Adams, Dr. Craig, KITT, and Many Others. Potomac Books, Inc.

References

External links

 Official website
 
 
 William Daniels (Aveleyman)
 

1927 births
Living people
Male actors from New York City
American male film actors
American male musical theatre actors
American male stage actors
American male television actors
American male voice actors
Military personnel from New York City
Northwestern University School of Communication alumni
Obie Award recipients
Outstanding Performance by a Lead Actor in a Drama Series Primetime Emmy Award winners
People from East New York, Brooklyn
Presidents of the Screen Actors Guild
20th-century American male actors
21st-century American male actors
Activists from New York (state)
United States Army personnel of World War II